Phelan is an unincorporated community in Cullman County, Alabama, United States. Phelan is located on the former Louisville and Nashville Railroad.

The Southern Express Company provided express mail service to Phelan.

The N. C. Arnold & Son Lumber Company operated a chipping mill in Phelan.

References

Unincorporated communities in Cullman County, Alabama
Unincorporated communities in Alabama